Malino may refer to:
Malino, Indonesia, a town in Indonesia
Malino, Russia, name of several inhabited localities in Russia
Malino, Croatia, a village near Oriovac, Croatia